Enric Bernat Lunar (born 22 November 1997) is a Spanish footballer who plays as a midfielder for CFJ Mollerussa in the Primera Catalana.

Early career
In his youth, Bernat played UE Tàrrega and AE Josep Maria Gené youth systems.

Career
Bernat began his career with FC Ascó in the Tercera División, the Spanish fourth tier, where he played for two seasons, scoring one goal.

In 2019, he agreed to join CF Reus Deportiu B and was sent to Canada to trial with Major League Soccer club Toronto FC. He then returned to Spain, however, Reus was expelled from the Spanish league prior to the season, for failing to pay their reserve players and he became a free agent again.

Afterwards, he joined Lleida Esportiu of the third tier Segunda División B, on a contract until June 2021. After suffering a serious injury and payment issues, he departed the club.

In May 2021, he signed with Toronto FC II of USL League One. Due to the COVID-19 pandemic, he was forced to take a 17 day quarantine upon arriving in Canada, after which he was able to train for a week to the club, before undergoing another two-week quarantine after the team moved to Arizona in the United States, where they would play the season. He made his debut for Toronto FC II on May 22, 2021 against North Texas SC. He recorded his first assist on June 2, on a goal by Kosi Thompson.

In January 2022, he returned to his former club FC Ascó, now in the fifth tier Tercera División RFEF.

In July 2022, he joined Cerdanyola del Vallès FC in the fourth tier Segunda Federación.

In January 2023, he joined CFJ Mollerussa in the sixth tier Primera Catalana.

Career statistics

Club

References

External links

Enric Bernat at La Preferente

1997 births
Living people
Spanish footballers
Association football midfielders
Lleida Esportiu footballers
Toronto FC II players
Tercera División players
USL League One players
Spanish expatriate footballers
Spanish expatriates in Canada
Expatriate soccer players in Canada
Tercera Federación players
UE Tàrrega players
Cerdanyola del Vallès FC players
FC Ascó players
Primera Catalana players